Miss República Dominicana 1982 was held on June 18, 1981. There were 28 candidates who competed for the national crown. The winner represented the Dominican Republic at the Miss Universe 1982 . The Señorita República Dominicana Mundo  will enter Miss World 1982. The Señorita República Dominicana Café will enter Reinado Internacional del Café 1982. This year was the only time that country won Miss World.

Results

Delegates

Azua - Margarita Asmar
Barahona - Wanda Ramos Lama
Distrito Nacional - Ana Sofia Peralta Tejada
Distrito Nacional - Margarita Cedeño López
Distrito Nacional - Mariasela Álvarez Lebrón
Distrito Nacional - Marlene Oviedo
Distrito Nacional - Martha de la Rosa Lara
Distrito Nacional - Minerva Soñé
Distrito Nacional - Vickiana Espinosa Cano
Distrito Nacional - Yulissa Cardona
Elías Piña - María Altagracia Peña
Independencia - Ana María Joaquín Mejía
La Altagracia - Anderina Arias del Rosario
La Romana - Fernanda Longoria
La Romana - Sandra Fermín
La Vega - Miosoty Rodríguez Rodríguez
María Trinidad Sánchez - Yasim Abud
Monte Cristi - Merilin Camacho
Puerto Plata - Sara María Taveras García
Salcedo - Rossy Montolio
Sánchez Ramírez - Yolanda Pimentel
San Juan - Miguelina Rodríguez
San Pedro de Macorís - Soraya Josefina Morey Molina
Santiago - Jacqueline Guerrero
Santiago - Julia Abikaram Zouaine
Santiago - Jacqueline Guerrero
Santiago - María Ferreira Castro
Santiago - Mónica Fernández Polanco
Valverde - Carolina Acosta

External links
 https://web.archive.org/web/20090211102742/http://ogm.elcaribe.com.do/ogm/consulta.aspx

Miss Dominican Republic
1982 beauty pageants
1982 in the Dominican Republic